NGC 331 is a barred spiral galaxy in the constellation Cetus. It was discovered in 1886 by Francis Leavenworth. It was described by Dreyer as "extremely faint, very small, round, a little brighter middle, 12th magnitude star 3 arcmin northeast." There are two candidates as to which object is NGC 331: PGC 2759 or PGC 3406, with the former being a much more likely candidate than the latter.

References

External links
 

0331
?
Cetus (constellation)
Barred spiral galaxies
002759